Peter Brown (born 18 October 1939) is a former deputy leader of the New Zealand First party. He formerly managed a stevedoring company and led the New Zealand Stevedoring Employers Association; he holds a sea captain's certificate.

In April 2008, Brown - an immigrant himself - drew widespread attention after voicing similar views and expressing concern at the increase in New Zealand's immigrant population, specifically ethnic Asians: "We are going to flood this country with Asian people with no idea what we are going to do with them when they come here." "The matter is serious. If we continue this open door policy there is real danger we will be inundated with people who have no intention of integrating into our society. The greater the number, the greater the risk. They will form their own mini-societies to the detriment of integration and that will lead to division, friction and resentment."

Political career

References

External links

1939 births
Living people
New Zealand First MPs
New Zealand list MPs
English emigrants to New Zealand
Unsuccessful candidates in the 1993 New Zealand general election
Members of the New Zealand House of Representatives
Unsuccessful candidates in the 2008 New Zealand general election
21st-century New Zealand politicians